Thomas Henry Hastings Davies (27 January 1789 – 11 December 1846) was a British Member of Parliament.

Davies was educated at the Royal Military College.  He joined the 52nd (Oxfordshire) Regiment of Foot as an ensign, rising to become a captain before, in 1809, he moved to the Grenadier Guards.  He served at the Battle of Waterloo, and was made a lieutenant-colonel the same year.  He eventually became a colonel in 1939, retiring the same year.

At the 1818 UK general election, Davies stood for the Whigs in Worcester, winning the seat.  In Parliament, he tended to oppose government spending, and was critical of what he saw as waste in the British Army.  He argued for the Army to intervene in support of Spain when French troops invaded in 1823.  He supported Catholic emancipation.  He supported electoral reform, and introduced a bill which limited polling to eight days, but introduced multiple polling places in larger towns and cities; this was successful.

Davies held the seat repeatedly, but was defeated at the 1835 UK general election.  While campaigning in the election, he was thrown from his carriage, and as a result was partly paralysed.  He stood again at the 1837 UK general election, regaining the seat without facing an opponent, then he retired at the 1841 UK general election, as the paralysis worsened.

References

1789 births
1846 deaths
52nd Regiment of Foot officers
Graduates of the Royal Military College, Sandhurst
Grenadier Guards officers
UK MPs 1818–1820
UK MPs 1820–1826
UK MPs 1826–1830
UK MPs 1830–1831
UK MPs 1831–1832
UK MPs 1832–1835
UK MPs 1837–1841
Whig (British political party) MPs for English constituencies